Vanadium was an Italian heavy metal band from Milan, Italy. It was one of the first heavy rock bands to appear on the Peninsula and is considered among the most successful European exponents of the genre.

History
Vanadium were founded in Milan in 1980 by Stefano Tessarin (guitar), Ruggero Zanolini (keyboards), Domenico Prantera (bass), Lio Mascheroni (drums) and Pino Scotto (vocals). Musically influenced by bands like Deep Purple, Thin Lizzy, Uriah Heep, Black Sabbath and Judas Priest, they had a difficult start due to scarce popularity of the metal genre in Italy, but managed to obtain a reasonable degree of success abroad.
Following the break through of their first single We Want to Live with Rock 'n' Roll (Durium, 1981), they went on to record seven studio albums and the live On Streets of Danger (1985). Their third album, Game Over (1984), is possibly their most successful, with figure sales of about 54,000 copies.

Following the collapse of their label Durium in 1988, Vanadium recorded their last album Seventheaven with GreenLine before breaking up in 1990. They temporarily reformed in 1995 and released their only album entirely sang in Italian, Nel cuore del caos. Despite showing good form, the album wasn't commercially successful, and the band split up again and for good after a final tour.

After the demise of Vanadium, the band members pursued solo projects. Stefano Tessarin, with Ruggero Zanolini and Lio Mascheroni formed the band Rustless. Pino Scotto went on to start a solo career and recorded eight albums. Domenico Prantera retired from playing music professionally and started managing emerging bands.

On 11 May 2014, the Italian publisher Crac Edizioni published the official Vanadium biography authored by music journalist Luca Fassina.

Discography

Albums
 Metal Rock - 1982
 A Race with the Devil - 1983
 Game Over - 1984
 Born to Fight - 1986
 Corruption of Innocence - 1987
 Seventheaven - 1989
 Nel cuore del caos - 1995

Live albums
 On Streets of Danger - 1985

Singles
 We Want to Live with Rock 'n' Roll/Heavy Metal - 1981
 Take My Blues Away/Take My Blues Away (extended version) - 1989

References

External links
Official Site
Myspace
YouTube

Italian heavy metal musical groups
Musical groups from Milan